The 1992 Berlin Marathon was the 19th running of the annual marathon race held in Berlin, Germany, held on 27 September 1992. South Africa's David Tsebe won the men's race in 2:08:07 hours, while the women's race was won by home athlete Uta Pippig in 2:30:22.

Results

Men

Women

References 

 Results. Association of Road Racing Statisticians. Retrieved 2020-04-02.

External links 
 Official website

1992 in Berlin
Berlin Marathon
Berlin Marathon
Berlin Marathon
Berlin Marathon